GNOME Core Applications is a software suite of approximately 30 application software that are packaged as part of the standard free and open-source GNOME desktop environment. GNOME Core Applications have the look and feel of the GNOME desktop, and often utilize the Adwaita design language. Some applications have been written from scratch and others are ports.

The employment of the newest graphical widgets offered by the latest version of GTK in order to implement the GNOME Human Interface Guidelines (HIG) ergonomically is the only feature which all GNOME Core Applications have in common. Some of the GNOME Core Applications are essential, while several are not, e.g. GNOME Weather. Most are graphical front-ends, e.g. GNOME Software, to underlying Linux system daemons, like e.g. journald, PackageKit, NetworkManager or PulseAudio.

Configuration 
 Settings – main interface to configure various aspects of GNOME. Diverse panels represent graphical front-ends to configure the NetworkManager daemon and other daemons.

Communication 
 Contacts – managing addresses
 Calls

Files 
 Document Scanner
 Eye of GNOME
Evince – the document viewer 
Files – the file browser
 Music – audio player with database
 Photos
 Videos – the media player

System 

 Connections - front-end for remote desktops. Introduced in GNOME 41.
 Disks
 Disk Usage Analyzer
 Extensions
 Fonts
 Logs – written in Vala, introduced with 3.12
 Help
 Software
 System Monitor
 Console (King's Cross)
Web

World 
 Clocks
 Maps
 Weather

Utilities 
 Calculator
 Calendar
 Characters
 Cheese
 Text Editor
 Tour

GNOME Circle 
GNOME Circle is a collection of applications which have been built to extend the GNOME platform, utilize GNOME technologies, and follow the GNOME human interface guidelines. They are hosted, developed, and managed in the GNOME official development infrastructure, on gitlab.gnome.org. Circle applications are not part of GNOME Core Applications.

References

External links 

  (homepage)

 
Free software programmed in C
Free software programmed in Vala